Robert W. Munley (April 16, 1906 – January 25, 1947) was an American politician.

Munley was born in Archbald, Pennsylvania and graduated from Archbald High School. He attended St. Thomas College, now the University of Scranton and worked for the Internal Revenue Service as a deputy collector from 1933-1938. He was elected as a Democrat to the Pennsylvania House of Representatives in 1939; reelected to serve four more consecutive terms; died while in office January 25, 1947. Munley died from a heart attack at his home in Archbald, Pennsylvania.

His father was William J. Munley who also served in the Pennsylvania General Assembly.

His wife Marion L. Munley also served in the Pennsylvania General Assembly.

His son James Martin Munley served as a United States District Judge.

Notes

1906 births
1947 deaths
People from Lackawanna County, Pennsylvania
University of Scranton alumni
Internal Revenue Service people
Democratic Party members of the Pennsylvania House of Representatives
20th-century American politicians